Southwest Airlines Flight 1380 was a Boeing 737-7H4 that experienced a contained engine failure  in the left CFM56-7B engine after departing from New York–LaGuardia Airport en route to Dallas Love Field on April 17, 2018. The engine cowl was broken in the failure and cowl fragments damaged the fuselage, causing explosive depressurization of the aircraft after damaging a cabin window. Other fragments caused damage to the wing. The crew carried out an emergency descent and diverted to Philadelphia International Airport. One passenger was partially ejected from the aircraft and later died. Eight other passengers received minor injuries. The aircraft was substantially damaged.

This accident was very similar to an accident suffered 20 months earlier by Southwest Airlines Flight 3472 flying the same aircraft type with the same engine type. After that earlier accident, the engine manufacturer, CFM, issued a service directive calling for ultrasonic inspections of the turbine fan blades with certain serial numbers, service cycles or service time. Southwest did not perform the inspection on the engine involved this failure because it was not within the parameters specified by the directive.

This was the first fatal airline accident involving a U.S. passenger carrier since the crash of Colgan Air Flight 3407 in February 2009 and the first aircraft accident involving Southwest Airlines that resulted in the death of a passenger.

Background

Flight 1380 was a regularly scheduled passenger flight from New York LaGuardia Airport to Dallas Love Field. The aircraft was a Boeing 737-7H4 with the registration N772SW, in service with Southwest Airlines since its manufacture in 2000. It was powered by two CFM56-7B engines.

Tammie Jo Shults, aged 56, a former United States Navy fighter pilot, was the captain of the flight. Darren Lee Ellisor, aged 44, a former United States Air Force (1997–2007) pilot with experience in the Boeing E-3 Sentry and a veteran in the Iraq War, was the first officer. Captain Shults had been with Southwest Airlines since 1994 and had logged a total of 11,715 flight hours, including 10,513 hours on the Boeing 737. First Officer Ellisor had been with the airline since 2008 and had 9,508 flight hours, with 6,927 hours on the Boeing 737. Five crew members and 144 passengers were on board.

Accident

As a result, most of the engine inlet and parts of the cowling broke off. Fragments from the inlet and cowling struck the wing and fuselage and broke a window at row 14 in the passenger compartment, which caused rapid decompression of the aircraft. The flight crew carried out an emergency descent of the aircraft and diverted it to Philadelphia International Airport (PHL). 

The flight crew stated that the departure and climb from LaGuardia were normal, with no indications of any problems; the first officer was flying and the captain was monitoring. They reported that the aircraft yawed and set off several cockpit emergency alarms; a "gray puff of smoke" appeared and the aircraft's cabin suddenly lost air pressure. The flight crew donned their emergency oxygen masks and the first officer began the emergency descent. The flight data recorder (FDR) showed that the left engine's performance parameters all dropped simultaneously, vibration became severe and within five seconds the cabin altitude alert activated. The FDR also showed that the aircraft rolled left by about 40° before the flight crew was able to counter the roll. The flight crew reported that the aircraft was very difficult to control throughout the remainder of the flight because of the extensive damage. The captain took over flying the plane and the first officer carried out the emergency checklist.  The captain asked the air traffic controller for a course diversion. She initially requested a course to the nearest airport, but then decided that the airport in Philadelphia was best equipped for this aircraft's emergency. The controller quickly provided vectors to PHL. The flight crew reported initial communications difficulties because of the loud noises, distraction and wearing oxygen masks, but as the aircraft descended, communications improved. The captain initially planned on a long final approach to make sure the crew completed all the emergency checklists. Upon learning of the passengers' injuries, however, she decided to speed the approach and expedite landing.

Three flight attendants, Rachel Fernheimer, Seanique Mallory and Kathryn Sandoval, were assigned to the flight and another Southwest Airlines employee was a passenger. All four reported that they heard a loud sound and felt severe vibration. The oxygen masks automatically deployed in the cabin. The flight attendants retrieved portable oxygen bottles and began moving through the cabin to assist passengers with their oxygen masks. As they moved toward the midcabin, they found an adult female passenger in row 14 blown part way out the broken window; with the help of two passengers, flight attendants pulled the victim inside the aircraft and other passengers performed emergency cardiopulmonary resuscitation. The passenger died after being admitted to a local hospital for treatment. A spokesperson for the Philadelphia Department of Public Health stated the cause of death of the passenger was blunt force trauma to the head, neck and torso. Eight other passengers sustained minor injuries.

Investigation

Initial investigation

The participants in the investigation included the National Transportation Safety Board (NTSB), the United States Federal Aviation Administration (FAA), Boeing, Southwest Airlines, GE Aviation, the Aircraft Mechanics Fraternal Association, the Southwest Airlines Pilots’ Association, the Transport Workers Union of America and UTC Aerospace Systems. Because the manufacturer of the failed engine (CFM) is a US-French joint venture, the French Bureau of Enquiry and Analysis for Civil Aviation Safety  also contributed investigators. Technical teams from CFM assisted with the investigation. The NTSB expected the investigation to take 12 to 15 months.

NTSB investigators analyzed a recording of the air traffic radar plots and observed that the radar had shown debris falling from the aircraft and used wind data to predict where ground searchers could find it.

On April 20, 2018, CFM issued Service Bulletin 72-1033, applicable to the CFM56-7B-series engine, and on the same day, the FAA issued emergency airworthiness directive (EAD) 2018-09-51 based on it. The CFM service bulletin recommended ultrasonic inspections of all fan blades on engines that had accumulated 20,000 engine cycles and subsequently at intervals not to exceed 3,000 engine cycles. The EAD required CFM56-7B engine fleet fan blade inspections for engines with 30,000 or greater cycles within 20 days of issuance, per the instructions provided in the service bulletin and if any crack indications were found, the affected fan blade was required to be removed from service before further flight. This directive was issued as a one-time inspection requirement. On the same day, European Aviation Safety Agency also issued EAD 2018-0093E (superseding EASA AD 2018-0071) that required the same ultrasonic fan blade inspections to be performed. The engine manufacturer estimated the new directive affected 352 engines in the US and 681 engines worldwide.

On April 23, 2018, Southwest Airlines announced that it was voluntarily going beyond the FAA EAD requirement and performing ultrasonic inspections on all CFM engines in its fleet, including two each on around 700 Boeing 737-700 and 737-800 aircraft.

On April 30, 2018, the aircraft involved in the accident was released by the NTSB and was flown by Southwest Airlines to a service facility performing major services on Boeing aircraft at Paine Field in Everett, Washington for repairs.

On May 2, 2018, the FAA issued follow-up airworthiness directive (AD) 2018-09-10, which expanded the inspections on CFM56-7B engines beyond the original EAD 2018-09-51. The new AD required inspections of engines with lower cycles and introduced repeat inspection requirements, including a requirement to perform detailed inspections on each fan blade before it accumulated 20,000 cycles since new or within 113 days, whichever occurred later, or within 113 days from the effective date of the AD if cycles since new on a fan blade were unknown with repeat inspections no later than 3,000 cycles since the last inspection. If any unserviceable fan blade was found, it was required to be removed from service before further flight. The FAA estimated that this AD affected 3,716 engines installed on aircraft of U.S. registry at an estimated cost of 8,585 per blade replacement.

On June 7, 2018, the aircraft involved in the accident was flown from Everett to Southern California Logistics Airport in Victorville, California for storage. As of 2021, the aircraft has not been flown.

Preliminary findings 
On May 3, 2018, the NTSB released an investigative update with preliminary findings:
 Initial examination of the aircraft revealed that the majority of the inlet cowl was missing, including the entire outer barrel, the aft bulkhead and the inner barrel forward of the containment ring. The inlet cowl containment ring was intact, but exhibited numerous impact witness marks. Examination of the fan case revealed no through-hole fragment exit penetrations; however, it did exhibit a breach hole that corresponded to one of the fan blade impact marks and fan case tearing.
 The number-13 fan blade had separated at the root; the dovetail remained installed in the fan disk. Examination of the fan blade dovetail exhibited features consistent with metal fatigue initiating at the convex side near the leading edge. Two pieces of the fan blade were recovered from within the engine between the fan blades and the outlet guide vanes. All the remaining fan blades exhibited a combination of trailing edge airfoil hard-body impact damage, trailing edge tears and missing material. Some also exhibited airfoil leading-edge tip curl or distortion. After the general in situ engine inspection was completed, the remaining fan blades were removed from the fan disk and an ultrasonic inspection was performed with no other cracks found.
 The number-13 fan blade was examined further at the NTSB materials laboratory. The fatigue fracture propagated from multiple origins at the convex side and was centered about  aft of the leading-edge face of the dovetail and was located  outboard of the root end face. The origin area was located outboard of the dovetail contact face coating and the visual condition of the coating appeared uniform with no evidence of spalls or disbonding. Six crack arrest lines (not including the fatigue boundary) were observed within the fatigue region and striations consistent with low-cycle fatigue crack growth were observed.
 The accident engine's fan blades had accumulated more than 32,000 engine cycles since new. Maintenance records showed that the fan blades had been periodically lubricated as required and that they were last overhauled 10,712 engine cycles before the accident. At the time of the last blade overhaul (November 2012), they were inspected using visual and fluorescent penetrant inspections. After an August 27, 2016 accident in Pensacola, Florida, in which a fan blade fractured, eddy-current inspections were incorporated into the overhaul process requirements. In the time since the fan blades' overhaul, the blade dovetails had been lubricated six times. At the time each of these fan blade lubrications occurred, the fan blade dovetail was visually inspected as required.
 The remainder of the airframe exhibited significant impact damage to the leading edge of the left wing, left side of the fuselage and left horizontal stabilizer. A large gouge impact mark, consistent in shape to a recovered portion of fan cowl and latching mechanism, was adjacent to the row 14 window, which was missing. No window, structural or engine material was found inside the cabin.

NTSB investigative hearings 
The NTSB held an investigative hearing on November 14, 2018. At the hearing, FAA Transport Standards Branch representative Victor Wicklund stated that the production inlets were not required to be subjected to certification testing, but if they were included and test damaged mirrored that of the accident aircraft, it would most likely constitute a certification failure. He indicated that the cowling may require design changes.

The NTSB held a second investigative hearing on November 19, 2019. The NTSB also issued five safety recommendations to the FAA, one to EASA and one to Southwest.

Final report 
On November 19, 2019, following the aforementioned hearing, the NTSB released the final report on the accident. The probable cause reads:

The National Transportation Safety Board (NTSB) determines that the probable cause of this accident was a low-cycle fatigue crack in the dovetail of fan blade No. 13, which resulted in the fan blade separating in flight and impacting the engine fan case at a location that was critical to the structural integrity and performance of the fan cowl structure. This impact led to the in-flight separation of fan cowl components, including the inboard fan cowl aft latch keeper, which struck the fuselage near a cabin window and caused the window to depart from the airplane, the cabin to rapidly depressurize and the passenger fatality.

The major recommendation of the report was that the Federal Aviation Administration should require Boeing to discover, for this aircraft and engine type, which parts of the engine fan case were susceptible to transmitting damage to the fan cowl structure and then redesign the fan cowl so that it retains its integrity after such a "blade out" event.

Reactions

On the day of the incident, Elaine Chao, the United States Secretary of Transportation, made a statement to "commend the pilots who safely landed the aircraft and the crew and fellow passengers who provided support and care for the injured, preventing what could have been far worse." Shortly thereafter, Martha McSally, then a member of the United States House of Representatives from Arizona, introduced a resolution in Congress commending Captain Shults.

On May 1, 2018, U.S. President Donald Trump welcomed crew members and select passengers in a ceremony at the Oval Office of the White House, thanking them all for their heroism.

Southwest Airlines gave each passenger $5,000 and a $1,000 voucher for future travel with the airline. Southwest Airlines bookings fell following the accident, resulting in a projected decline in revenue for the airline for the second quarter of 2018. Following the accident, Lilia Chavez, a passenger on board the flight, filed a lawsuit against Southwest Airlines claiming that she suffers from post-traumatic stress disorder since the accident. Her lawsuit was later settled.

Captain Shults wrote a book about the incident titled Nerves of Steel. The book was published in the United States on October 8, 2019.

The aircraft, N772SW, a Boeing 737-7H4, was subsequently flown to Boeing in Everett on April 30, 2018 for repairs. The plane was moved into storage at Victorville on June 7, 2018. The aircraft remains there and has not made a scheduled revenue flight since. It has had its Southwest titles removed, but remains in the basic Southwest livery.

In popular culture 
The incident involving Flight 1380 was featured on the fifth episode of season 21 of the Canadian documentary series Mayday, known in the United States as Air Disasters. The episode is titled "Cabin Catastrophe".

See also

 National Airlines Flight 27, a 1973 accident involving an uncontained engine failure and a passenger being ejected from the aircraft through a window
 Delta Air Lines Flight 1288, a 1996 accident involving an uncontained engine failure and two fatalities from pieces of the engine penetrating the aircraft fuselage
 TAM Flight 9755, a 2001 accident involving an uncontained engine failure and a passenger being partially ejected from the aircraft through a window and killed
 Southwest Airlines Flight 3472, a 2016 accident involving the same airline with an uncontained engine failure with a similar aircraft and engine type without fatalities
 United Airlines Flight 1175, a prior fan blade out incident with loss of cowling on the larger Boeing 777-200 in 2018 with no injuries
 United Airlines Flight 328, the sister plane of the one involved in United Airlines flight 1175 suffered another fan blade out incident with loss of cowling in 2021 with no injuries
British Airways Flight 5390, a BAC-111 flying from Birmingham Airport, England to Malaga Airport that experienced an explosive decompression after part of the cockpit's windscreen broke off due to a maintenance failure, blowing the captain partially out of the plane. The co-pilot was able to land the plane and the captain survived.
Qantas Flight 32, Air France Flight 066 and United Airlines Flight 232, cases of uncontained engine failure

Notes

References

External links

 Southwest Airlines press room with releases about the accident
 
 NTSB investigation docket
 

Accidents and incidents involving the Boeing 737 Next Generation
Airliner accidents and incidents caused by engine failure
Airliner accidents and incidents involving uncontained engine failure
Airliner accidents and incidents in Pennsylvania
Airliner accidents and incidents involving in-flight depressurization
April 2018 events in the United States
Aviation accidents and incidents in the United States in 2018
Southwest Airlines accidents and incidents